Semen, also known as seminal fluid, is an organic bodily fluid created to contain spermatozoa. It is secreted by the gonads (sexual glands) and other sexual organs of male or hermaphroditic animals and can fertilize the female ovum. Semen is produced and originates from the seminal vesicle, which is located in the pelvis. The process that results in the discharge of semen from the urethral orifice is called ejaculation. In humans, seminal fluid contains several components besides spermatozoa: proteolytic and other enzymes as well as fructose are elements of seminal fluid which promote the survival of spermatozoa, and provide a medium through which they can move or "swim". The fluid is adapted to be discharged deep into the vagina, so the spermatozoa can pass into the uterus and form a zygote with an egg.

Semen is also a form of genetic material. In animals, semen has been collected for cryoconservation. Cryoconservation of animal genetic resources is a practice that calls for the collection of genetic material in efforts for conservation of a particular breed.

Physiology

Fertilization
Depending on the species, spermatozoa can fertilize ova externally or internally. In external fertilization, the spermatozoa fertilize the ova directly, outside of the female's sexual organs. Female fish, for example, spawn ova into their aquatic environment, where they are fertilized by the semen of the male fish.

During internal fertilization, however, fertilization occurs inside the female's sexual organs. Internal fertilization takes place after insemination of a female by a male through copulation. In most vertebrates, including amphibians, reptiles, birds and monotreme mammals, copulation is achieved through the physical mating of the cloaca of the male and female. In marsupial and placental mammals, copulation occurs through the vagina.

Human

Composition
During the process of ejaculation, sperm passes through the ejaculatory ducts and mixes with fluids from the seminal vesicles, the prostate, and the bulbourethral glands to form the semen. The seminal vesicles produce a yellowish viscous fluid rich in fructose and other substances that makes up about 70% of human semen. The prostatic secretion, influenced by dihydrotestosterone, is a whitish (sometimes clear), thin fluid containing proteolytic enzymes, citric acid, acid phosphatase and lipids. The bulbourethral glands secrete a clear secretion into the lumen of the urethra to lubricate it.

Sertoli cells, which nurture and support developing spermatocytes, secrete a fluid into seminiferous tubules that helps transport sperm to the genital ducts. The ductuli efferentes possess cuboidal cells with microvilli and lysosomal granules that modify the ductal fluid by reabsorbing some fluid. Once the semen enters the ductus epididymis the principal cells, which contain pinocytotic vessels indicating fluid reabsorption, secrete glycerophosphocholine which most likely inhibits premature capacitation. The accessory genital ducts, the seminal vesicle, prostate glands, and the bulbourethral glands, produce most of the seminal fluid.

Seminal plasma of humans contains a complex range of organic and inorganic constituents.

The seminal plasma provides a nutritive and protective medium for the spermatozoa during their journey through the female reproductive tract. The normal environment of the vagina is a hostile one (c.f. sexual conflict) for sperm cells, as it is very acidic (from the native microflora producing lactic acid), viscous, and patrolled by immune cells. The components in the seminal plasma attempt to compensate for this hostile environment. Basic amines such as putrescine, spermine, spermidine and cadaverine are responsible for the smell and flavor of semen. These alkaline bases counteract and buffer the acidic environment of the vaginal canal, and protect DNA inside the sperm from acidic denaturation.

The components and contributions of semen are as follows:

A 1992 World Health Organization report described normal human semen as having a volume of 2 mL or greater, pH of 7.2 to 8.0, sperm concentration of 20×106 spermatozoa/mL or more, sperm count of 40×106 spermatozoa per ejaculate or more, and motility of 50% or more with forward progression (categories a and b) of 25% or more with rapid progression (category a) within 60 minutes of ejaculation.

A 2005 review of the literature found that the average reported physical and chemical properties of human semen were as follows:

Appearance and consistency

Semen is typically translucent with white, grey or even yellowish tint. Blood in the semen can cause a pink or reddish colour, known as hematospermia, and may indicate a medical problem which should be evaluated by a doctor if the symptom persists.

After ejaculation, the latter part of the ejaculated semen coagulates immediately, forming globules, while the earlier part of the ejaculate typically does not. After a period typically ranging from 15 to 30 minutes, prostate-specific antigen present in the semen causes the decoagulation of the seminal coagulum. It is postulated that the initial clotting helps keep the semen in the vagina, while liquefaction frees the sperm to make their journey to the ova.

A 2005 review found that the average reported viscosity of human semen in the literature was 3–7 centipoises (cP), or, equivalently, millipascal-seconds (mPa·s).

Quality
Semen quality is a measure of the ability of semen to accomplish fertilization. Thus, it is a measure of fertility in a man. It is the sperm in the semen that is the fertile component, and therefore semen quality involves both sperm quantity and sperm quality.

Quantity
The volume of semen ejaculate varies but is generally about 1 teaspoonful or less. A review of 30 studies concluded that the average was around 3.4 milliliters (mL), with some studies finding amounts as high as 5.0 mL or as low as 2.3 mL. In a study with Swedish and Danish men, a prolonged interval between ejaculations caused an increase of the sperm count in the semen but not an increase of its amount.

Storage
Semen can be stored in diluents such as the Illini Variable Temperature (IVT) diluent, which have been reported to be able to preserve high fertility of semen for over seven days. The IVT diluent is composed of several salts, sugars and antibacterial agents and gassed with CO2.

Semen cryopreservation can be used for far longer storage durations. For human sperm, the longest reported successful storage with this method is 21 years.

Health

Disease transmission
Semen can transmit many sexually transmitted diseases and pathogens, including viruses like HIV and Ebola. Swallowing semen carries no additional risk other than those inherent in fellatio. This includes transmission risk for sexually transmitted diseases such as human papillomavirus or herpes, especially for people with bleeding gums, gingivitis or open sores. Viruses in semen survive for a long time once outside the body.

Bloodiness

The presence of blood in semen or hematospermia may be undetectable (it can only be seen microscopically) or visible in the fluid. Its cause could be the result of inflammation, infection, blockage, or injury of the male reproductive tract or a problem within the urethra, testicles, epididymis or prostate. It usually clears up without treatment, or with antibiotics, but if persistent further semen analysis and other urogenital system tests might be needed to find out the cause.

Allergy
In rare circumstances, humans can develop an allergy to semen, called human seminal plasma sensitivity. It appears as a typical localized or systemic allergic response upon contact with seminal fluid. There is no one protein in semen responsible for the reaction. Symptoms can appear after first intercourse or after subsequent intercourse. A semen allergy can be distinguished from a latex allergy by determining if the symptoms disappear with use of a condom. Desensitization treatments are often very successful.

Benefits to females
Females may benefit from absorbing seminal fluid. Such benefits include male insects transferring nutrients to females via their ejaculate; in both humans and bovines, the fluid has antiviral and antibacterial properties; and useful bacteria such as Lactobacillus have been detected in fluid transferred from birds and mammals.

Society and culture

Qigong

Qigong and Chinese medicine place huge emphasis on a form of energy called 精 (pinyin: jīng, also a morpheme denoting "essence" or "spirit") – which one attempts to develop and accumulate. "Jing" is sexual energy and is considered to dissipate with ejaculation, so masturbation is considered "energy suicide" amongst those who practice this art. According to Qigong theory, energy from many pathways/meridians becomes diverted and transfers itself to the sexual organs during sexual excitement. The ensuing orgasm and ejaculation will then finally expel the energy from the system completely. The Chinese proverb 一滴精，十滴血 (pinyin: yì dī jīng, shí dī xuè, literally: a drop of semen is equal to ten drops of blood) illustrates this point.

The scientific term for semen in Chinese is 精液 (pinyin: jīng yè, literally: fluid of essence/jing) and the term for sperm is 精子 (pinyin: jīng zǐ, literally: basic element of essence/jing), two modern terms with classical referents.

Indian philosophy

In Ayurveda, semen is said to be made from forty drops of blood. It is considered to be the end of the food digestion cycle.

One of the key aspects of Hindu religion is abstinence called brahmacharya. It can be lifelong or during a specific period or on specific days. Brahmacharya attaches great importance to semen retention.

Many yogic texts also indicate the importance of semen retention and there are specific asanas and Bandhas for it like Mula Bandana and Aswini Mudra.

Greek philosophy
In Ancient Greece, Aristotle remarked on the importance of semen: "For Aristotle, semen is the residue derived from nourishment, that is of blood, that has been highly concocted to the optimum temperature and substance. This can only be emitted by the male as only the male, by nature of his very being, has the requisite heat to concoct blood into semen." According to Aristotle, there is a direct connection between food and semen: "Sperms are the excretion of our food, or to put it more clearly, as the most perfect component of our food."

The connection between food and physical growth, on the one hand, and semen, on the other, allows Aristotle to warn against "engag[ing] in sexual activity at too early an age ... [since] this will affect the growth of their bodies. Nourishment that would otherwise make the body grow is diverted to the production of semen. Aristotle is saying that at this stage the body is still growing; it is best for sexual activity to begin when its growth is 'no longer abundant', for when the body is more or less at full height, the transformation of nourishment into semen does not drain the body of needed material."

Additionally, "Aristotle tells us that the region round the eyes was the region of the head most fruitful of seed ("most seedy" σπερματικώτατος), pointing to generally recognised effects upon the eyes of sexual indulgence and to practices which imply that seed comes from liquid in the region of the eyes." This may be explained by the belief of the Pythagoreans that "semen is a drop of the brain [τὸ δε σπέρμα εἶναι σταγόνα ἐγκέφαλου]."

Greek Stoic philosophy conceived of the Logos spermatikos ("seminal word") as the principle of active reason that fecundated passive matter. The Jewish philosopher Philo similarly spoke in sexual terms of the Logos as the masculine principle of reason that sowed seeds of virtue in the feminine soul.

The Christian Platonist Clement of Alexandria likened the Logos to physical blood as the "substance of the soul", and noted that some held "that the animal semen is substantially foam of its blood". Clement reflected an early Christian view that "the seed ought not be wasted nor scattered thoughtlessly nor sown in a way it cannot grow."

Women were believed to have their own version, which was stored in the womb and released during climax. Retention was believed to cause female hysteria.

In ancient Greek religion as a whole, semen is considered a form of miasma, and ritual purification was to be practised after its discharge.

Reverence
In some pre-industrial societies, semen and other body fluids were revered because they were believed to be magical. Blood is an example of such a fluid, but semen was also widely believed to be of supernatural origin and effect and was, as a result, considered holy or sacred. The ancient Sumerians believed that semen was "a divine substance, endowed on humanity by Enki", the god of water. The semen of a god was believed to have magical generative powers. In Sumerian mythology, when Enki's seed was planted in the ground, it caused the spontaneous growth of eight previously-nonexistent plants. Enki was believed to have created the Tigris and Euphrates rivers by masturbating and ejaculating into their empty riverbeds. The Sumerians believed that rain was the semen of the sky-god An, which fell from the heavens to inseminate his consort, the earth-goddess Ki, causing her to give birth to all the plants of the earth.

Dew was once thought to be a sort of rain that fertilized the earth and, in time, became a metaphor for semen. The Bible employs the term "dew" in this sense in such verses as Song of Solomon 5:2 and Psalm 110:3, declaring, in the latter verse, for example, that the people should follow only a king who was virile enough to be full of the "dew" of youth.

The orchid's twin bulbs were thought to resemble the testicles, which is the etymology of the disease orchiditis. There was an ancient Roman belief that the flower sprang from the spilled semen of copulating satyrs.

In a number of mythologies around the world, semen is often considered analogous to breast milk. In the traditions of Bali, it is considered to be the returning or refunding of the milk of the mother in an alimentary metaphor. The wife feeds her husband who returns to her his semen, the milk of human kindness, as it were.

Espionage

When the British Secret Intelligence Service discovered that semen made a good invisible ink, Sir George Mansfield Smith-Cumming noted of his agents that "Every man (is) his own stylo".

Ingestion

Spiritual
The Borborites, also known as the Phibionites, were an early Christian Gnostic sect during the late fourth century AD whose alleged practices involving sacred semen are described by the early Christian heretic-hunter Epiphanius of Salamis in his Panarion. Epiphanius claims that the Borborites had a sacred text called the Greater Questions of Mary, which contained an episode in which, during a post-resurrection appearance, Jesus took Mary Magdalene to the top of a mountain, where he pulled a woman out of his side and engaged in sexual intercourse with her. Then, upon ejaculating, Jesus drank his own semen and told Mary, "Thus we must do, that we may live." Upon hearing this, Mary instantly fainted, to which Jesus responded by helping her up and telling her, "O thou of little faith, wherefore didst thou doubt?" This story was supposedly the basis for the Borborite Eucharist ritual, in which they allegedly engaged in orgies and drank semen and menstrual blood as the "body and blood of Christ" respectively. Bart D. Ehrman, a scholar of early Christianity, casts doubt on the accuracy of Epiphanius's summary, commenting that "the details of Epiphanius's description sound very much like what you can find in the ancient rumor mill about secret societies in the ancient world".

In some cultures, semen is considered to have special properties associated with masculinity. Several tribes of Papua New Guinea, including the Sambia and the Etoro, believe that semen promotes sexual maturation among the younger men of their tribe. To them, semen possesses the manly nature of the tribal elders, and in order to pass down their authority and powers, younger men of their next generation must fellate their elders and ingest their semen. Prepubescent and postpubescent males are required to engage in this practice. This act may also be associated with the culturally active homosexuality throughout these and other tribes.

Semen ingestion has had central importance in some cultures around the world. In Baruya culture, there is a secret ritual in which boys give fellatio to young males and drink their semen, to "re-engender themselves before marriage".

Sexual
There are several sexual practices involving the ingestion of semen, which may be done with one or more partners.  Practices involving the oral intake of semen include:

 Cum swapping, in which a woman passes semen from her mouth into that of another woman.
 Felching is a sexual practice involving the act of sucking semen out of the anus of one's partner. According to the entry for "felch" in the Oxford English Dictionary, the earliest occurrence of the word in print appears to have been in The Argot of the Homosexual Subculture by Ronald A. Farrell in 1972, although this usage was as a synonym for anilingus.
  is a Japanese term for sexual activity in which a person, usually a woman, consumes the semen of one or more men, often from some kind of container.  "Gokkun" can also refer to the sexual act of swallowing semen after performing fellatio or participating in a bukkake. The word "gokkun" is onomatopoetic, and translates roughly as the English word "gulp", the sound made by swallowing.
 Snowballing or snowdropping is the sexual practice in which one person takes someone's semen into their mouth and then passes it to the mouth of another, usually through kissing. The term was originally used only by gay and bisexual men. Researchers who surveyed over 1,200 gay or bisexual men at New York LGBT community events in 2004 found that around 20% said they had engaged in snowballing at least once. In heterosexual couples, a woman who has performed fellatio may afterwards return the semen to her partner's mouth, mixed with saliva; the couple or other partners may then exchange the fluid several times, causing its volume to increase (hence "snowballing").

Euphemisms
A huge variety of euphemisms and dysphemisms have been invented to describe semen. For a complete list of terms, see sexual slang.

Slang terms for semen include cum, jizz, spunk (primarily British English), spooge and/or splooge, load, nut, seed, and love juice. The term cum can also refer to an orgasm (when used as a verb rather than as a noun), while load is derived from the phrase blowing a load, referring to an ejaculation. The term nut originally refers to the testicles, but can be used to refer both semen and ejaculation.

See also

 Cum shot
 Milt
 Semen extender
 Seminal fluid protein
 Sperm donation
 Spermadhesin
 Spermatozoon
 Vaginal lubrication

References

External links

 
 SUNY Podcast – Semen study results
 

 
Body fluids
Men's health
Penis